Doukole Vanessa Blé (born 12 August 1991) is a professional women's basketball who plays for the Spanish club CB Avenida in the Women's EuroLeague. Born in Ivory Coast, she represented  internationally.

References

External links 
Profile at eurobasket.com

1991 births
Living people
Sportspeople from Abidjan
Ivorian emigrants to Spain
Naturalised citizens of Spain
Spanish women's basketball players
Spanish women's 3x3 basketball players
Centers (basketball)
Galatasaray S.K. (women's basketball) players
Spanish expatriate basketball people in Turkey
Spanish people of Ivorian descent
Spanish sportspeople of African descent